HMP19 protein is a protein that in humans is encoded by the HMP19 gene.

References

Further reading 

Human proteins